Jan Axel Blomberg (born 2 August 1969) is a Norwegian heavy metal drummer known professionally as Hellhammer. He is best known as the drummer of Mayhem, which he joined in 1988. In 1987 Blomberg formed the avant-garde black metal band Arcturus (under the name Mortem) with Steinar Sverd Johnsen, which broke up in April 2007 and reunited in 2011. He named himself after the Swiss extreme metal band Hellhammer. Praised as a talented musician, Blomberg is a three-time winner of the Spellemannprisen award.

Early life
As a child, Blomberg's main interests were football (soccer) and wrestling. At first he had no interest in drums or drumming, but as music became more appealing to him he started to find the different instruments interesting, which eventually led to an interest in drums. His grandparents purchased him his first three drum kits; the first one was a four-piece jazz kit. With these he began learning how to play drums by playing along with albums he listened to. He was into heavy metal bands such as Iron Maiden, Metallica and Slayer, but also bands like Depeche Mode and Duran Duran. He then found out about Venom and Celtic Frost and eventually jazz, due to influences from a past drum teacher.

Career

Before joining Mayhem, Blomberg played in various local bands, including the progressive metal band Tritonus, where he met Carl August Tidemann, the man who became the Arcturus and Winds guitarist. He did some live performances as well, and then was hired by Mayhem, who needed to replace Kjetil Manheim; Blomberg got the job and took the pseudonym Hellhammer.

The first recordings he did with Mayhem were two songs for a compilation album around 1989, with the songs Carnage and The Freezing Moon. The first proper recording he did with Mayhem was Live in Leipzig in 1990. After that album, Mayhem had some trouble with the line up due to the suicide of the singer Dead and Necrobutcher's departure from the band. During this time he founded the band Arcturus together with Sverd in 1991, out of the remains of the band Mortem. They released the 7" My Angel in 1991 and later the mini album Constellation.
In 1995 he joined Immortal as a session drummer during their tour that year, he also agreed to play drums on their first official Video, Grim and Frostbitten Kingdoms. He also briefly played for Emperor during this period. The recording and release of the Arcturus debut album Aspera Hiems Symfonia also happened this year.

In 1997 Jan Axel began working with Covenant, now known as The Kovenant, for the recording of their second album, Nexus Polaris. That album was released in 1998 with a following European tour. During 1997 Arcturus also released another album, La Masquerade Infernale.

The next year another album from The Kovenant was released, Animatronic.

During the year 2000 he recorded a mini album with his new band Winds, Of Entity And Mind, which was released in May 2001. Winds also recorded a full-length album during spring 2001, Reflections of the I.

Jan Axel is now a two-time Norwegian Grammy Awards winner, in 1998 for The Kovenant with Nexus Polaris and in 1999 for The Kovenant with Animatronic. They claimed the prize for best hard rock album both years. In addition to these mentioned involvements, Jan Axel has also done numerous appearances as a guest or session musician on other releases.

In 2005, he was interviewed for the black metal mini-documentary that was included with the 2-disc DVD edition of Metal: A Headbanger's Journey, in addition to other Mayhem members Necrobutcher (Jørn Stubberud) and Blasphemer (Rune Eriksen).

In 2009, Hellhammer appeared on Eyes of Noctum's album Inceptum, where he played drums on six tracks. Eyes of Noctum are a black metal band from America featuring Weston Cage, son of Nicolas Cage as their lead singer.

Hellhammer played with keyboardist Andy Winter on one of his albums.

Also in 2010, he played on Nidingr's  album Wolf-Father. In 2011, Arcturus reunited, Hellhammer included, and released Arcturian in 2015.

Controversy
Blomberg has courted controversy in the past by making numerous racist comments and advocating violence against homosexuals. The black metal biography Lords of Chaos quotes him as saying, "I'll put it this way, we don't like black people here. Black metal is for white people.... I'm pretty convinced that there are differences between races as well as everything else. I think that like animals, some races are more ... you know, like a cat is much more intelligent than a bird or a cow, or even a dog, and I think that's also the case with different races." Blomberg said in a 2004 interview, "I don't give a crap if the fans are white, black, green, yellow, or blue. For me music and politics don't go hand in hand."

Beliefs
Blomberg had joined Mayhem under the influence of friends, so he came to know the depressive vocalist "Dead" and the satanic guitarist "Euronymous". Blomberg naively came to give away his recording tapes and therefore officially joined the band.

He, however, came to distrust the attitudes he considered "weird":

Soon after, Blomberg came to have his first contact with Satanism, at first, therefore, out of youthful curiosity, having read different books on occultism involving different rituals, Blomberg soon realized that he was entering a dangerous path:

Session of Antestor

Blomberg was session drummer for the Christian black metal band Antestor, releasing the EP "Det tapte liv" and, therefore, the following year to the album "The Forsaken" which also had the appearance of vocalist Ann-Mari Edvardsen.

Hellhammer's involvement was in spite of Antestor and Mayhem having an adversarial relationship since the former's "Crush Evil" era; which was characterized by Mayhem's guitarist, Euronymous, trying to force the band to break up.

Hellhammer's appearance on the recordings received a polarized reception in the metal scene. In an interview with the Russian metal site Metal Library on 7 January 2007, Blomberg says:

The vocalist Ronny Hansen knew Hellhammer personally and asked him to play for the band. The members of Antestor gave Hellhammer the demos for the songs in person, but according to Blomberg, he never met the Antestor members in studio personally because the producer Børge Finstad wanted to work with each musician alone per time to achieve better and more productive results. The band also asked Hellhammer to play live for them, but Blomberg refused. It was not a question about their beliefs, as Hellhammer explains: "In my opinion, black metal today is just music. I will tell you that neither I nor other members of Mayhem never really were against religion or something else. We are primarily interested in music." Additionally, Hellhammer stated that no member of the new line-up was a Satanist, and that the "Satanic stuff […] isn't what I feel Mayhem is about today. […] Mayhem's music is still dark, but I wouldn't say that it's Satanic." Antestor vocalist Ronny Hansen commented on Blomberg's appearance:

Drums/techniques

Equipment (2012)
Sonor Drums: Black Nickel Hardware – White Marine Pearl (Outer), Blue Stratawood (Inner)
Bass Drums: 20x20 – Evans EQ4 – Medium Maple
Snare Drum: 13x4,25 – Evans Genera Dry – Heavy Beech – Pearl Masterworks Snare, Pearl CZX Snare
Toms: 8x10, 10x12, 12x13, 13x14, 16x18 – Thin Maple
Cymbals: Paiste Rude (some custom made)
Pedals: Axis A Short-boards – Variable Drive: Lowest – Springs: Highest
Sticks: B-Stick 3AN

Techniques
Hands: French grip with the Moeller method.

Discography

As a member

Mortem
Slow Death (Demo) – (1989)
Ravnsvart – (2019)

Arcturus
Promo 90 (Demo) – (1990)
My Angel (EP) - (1991)
Constellation MCD/MLP – (1994)
Aspera Hiems Symfonia – (1996)
Constellation – (1997)
La Masquerade Infernale – (1997)
Disguised Masters – (1999)
Aspera Hiems Symfonia/Constellation/My Angel re-release – (2001)
The Sham Mirrors – (2002)
Sideshow Symphonies – (2005)
Shipwrecked in Oslo – (2006)
Arcturian – (2015)

Mayhem
Live in Leipzig – (1993)
De Mysteriis Dom Sathanas – (1994)
Out from the Dark – (1996)
Wolf's Lair Abyss – (1997)
Ancient Skin / Necrolust – (1997)
Mediolanum Capta Est – (1999)
Necrolust / Total Warfare (Split with Zyklon-B) – (1999)
Grand Declaration of War – (2000)
Live in Marseille 2000 – (2001)
European Legions – (2001)
U.S. Legions – (2001)
The Studio Experience (Box Set) – (2002)
Freezing Moon/Jihad (Split with Meads of Asphodel) – (2002)
Legions of War – (2003)
Chimera – (2004)
Ordo Ad Chao – (2007)
Esoteric Warfare – (2014)
Daemon – (2019)

Covenant/The Kovenant
Nexus Polaris – (1998)
Animatronic – (1999)
SETI – (2003)

Troll
The Last Predators – (2000)
Universal – (2001)

Winds
Of Entity and Mind – (2001)
Reflections of the I – (2001)
The Imaginary Direction of Time – (2004)
Prominence and Demise – (2007)
Into Transgressions of Thought – (2015)

Mezzerschmitt
Weltherrschaft – (2002)

Shining
Angst, Självdestruktivitetens Emissarie – (2002)
Dolorian/Shining – (2004)
Through Years of Oppression – (2004)
The Darkroom Sessions – (2004)
The Eerie Cold – (2005)

Age of Silence
Acceleration – (2004)
Complications - Trilogy of Intricacy – (2005)

Dimmu Borgir
Stormblåst MMV – (2005)
In Sorte Diaboli – (2007)

Carnivora
Judas – (2004)

Umoral
7" Umoral EP – (2007)

Nidingr
 Wolf-Father – (2010)

As a session musician

Tritonus
Live drummer

Emperor
Live drummer – (1992)
Moon over Kara-Shehr – on the compilation Nordic Metal: A Tribute to Euronymous – (1995)

Immortal
Live drummer, Sons of Northern Darkness Tour Part II – (1995)
Grim and Frostbitten Kingdoms music video – on the Masters of Nebulah Frost video cassette – (1995)

Jørn
Worldchanger – (2001)
The Gathering (Best of) – (2007)

Thorns
Thorns – (2001)

Vidsyn
On Frostbitten Path Beneath demo – (2004)
On Frostbitten Path Beneath – (2004)

Antestor
Det Tapte Liv – (2004)
The Forsaken – (2005)

Endezzma
 Alone (EP) – (2007)

Suchthaus
The Dark Side and the Bright Side – (2011)

Andy Winter
Incomprehensible – (2013)

Dynasty of Darkness
Empire of Pain – (2014)

Circle of Chaos
 Crossing The Line – (2014)

As a guest

Ulver
Synen – on the compilation Souvenirs from Hell – (1997)

Fleurety
Department of Apocalyptic Affairs (track 1) – (2000)

Eyes of Noctum
Inceptum (tracks 2, 3, 4, 8, 10, 11) – (2009)

Lord Impaler
Admire the Cosmos Black (all tracks) – (2011)

References

External links

Hellhammer's official website

1969 births
Living people
People from Trysil
Dimmu Borgir members
Norwegian heavy metal drummers
Male drummers
Mayhem (band) members
Musicians from Oslo
Norwegian black metal musicians
Norwegian multi-instrumentalists
Arcturus (band) members
Winds (band) members
The Kovenant members
Immortal (band) members
Antestor members